Gorodki (townlets;), is an ancient Russian folk sport whose popularity has spread to Karelia, Finland, Sweden, Ingria, parts of Lithuania, and Estonia.  Similar in concept to bowling and also somewhat to horseshoes, the aim of the game is to knock out groups of skittles arranged in various patterns by throwing a bat at them.  The skittles, or pins, are called gorodki (literally little cities or townlets), and the square zone in which they are arranged is called the gorod (city).

In the Scandinavian and Baltic languages, the game has many different names, such as kurnimäng, kriuhka, köllöi, keili, and miestučiai. The Finnish variant is called kyykkä, or Finnish skittles.

The game is mentioned in the Old Russian Chronicles and was known in a form that is quite close to the modern one at least from the 17th century, since one of the famous gorodki players was Peter the Great.

Gameplay

The game consists of throwing a bat from a predetermined distance at the gorodki, which are arranged in one of 15 configurations:
 Cannon (pushka)
 Fork (vilka)
 Star (zvezda)
 Arrow (strela)
 Well (kolodets)
 Crankshaft (kolenchatyy val)
 Artillery (artilleriya)
 Racquet (raketka)
 Machine gun installation (pulemyotnoe gnezdo)
 Lobster (rak)
 Watchmen (chasovye)
 Sickle (serp)
 Shooting gallery (tir)
 Airplane (samolet)
 Letter (pis'mo)

The goal is to completely knock the gorodki out of a marked square using the fewest possible number of throws.

"Letter" figure rules 

When a player reaches the "letter" figure, a special set of rules apply:
 You must aim to the center spot and knock the gorodki in the figure out (players say "open the letter") 
 Another four gorodki return to their place unless the center spot is knocked out
 You must knock the figure from 13 metres.

History
Although traditionally Gorodki is a folk game, it was played by such Russian historical figures as emperor Peter I, Generalissimus Alexander Suvorov, Vladimir Lenin, and Joseph Stalin, as well as cultural luminaries like Ivan Pavlov, Leo Tolstoy, Maksim Gorky, Nikolay Timofeev-Ressovsky, and others.  The game as it existed prior to 1923 had no rules per se.  It was organized into a legitimate sport and its rules codified in 1923, when the first All-Soviet-Union competition was held, and it became an event at the first All-Union Olympiad in 1928.

Popular culture
The game was shown in an episode of the Soviet animated series Nu, pogodi!.
Additionally, Gorodki was featured in the popular CBS reality show The Amazing Race 17, episode 7, during a Roadblock challenge. The game was also featured on Schlag den Raab on 4 June 2011, and was a favorite childhood pastime of the eponymous protagonist of the novel Pnin by Vladimir Nabokov (p. 106, Vintage). The game can be played on the Wii game system through the game disc REC ROOM released in 2009.

See also
Bowling
Bunnock
Finnish skittles
Kubb

References

Throwing games
Precision sports
Russian games
Russian inventions
Sports originating in Russia
Bowling